The Ezh2 gene (enhancer of zeste homolog 2) is a component of polycomb repressive complex 2 (PRC2). This histone methyltransferase performs its biological activity by catalyzing the trimethylation of histone 3 lysine 27 (H3K27me3). The biological function of this gene allows for it to transcriptionally repress the target, Hox,  inhibitor genes of osteochodrogenesis. Ezh2 is crucial for epigenetic regulation of specific patterning during osteochondrogenesis, or bone and cartilage development, of the craniofacial skeletal elements.  By repressing inhibitors, Ezh2 promotes bone and cartilage formation in facial skeletal features arising from the neural crest.  Above average Ezh2 expression has become a biological marker for the most aggressive form for breast cancer known as Inflammatory Breast Cancer (IBC). But in 2013, a study performed by Zhaomei Mu and his associates concluded that the knockdown gene for Ezh2 inhibited both the migration and invasion of IBC cells. Also in vivo, its knockdown gene suppressed tumor growth, most likely by the presence of fewer blood vessels, or reduced angiogenesis, in the Ezh2 knockdown tumor versus Ezh2 tumors.

See also
 EZH2

References

Genes